Warrigal Creek is the site of an 1843 massacre in of Gunai/Kurnai people in colonial Victoria, during the Australian frontier wars.

Massacre
In July 1843, a man named Ronald Macalister was killed by Aboriginal men near Port Albert, on the coast of Victoria. The Scottish colonist and pastoralist, Angus McMillan, led a group of around 20 colonists to attack and kill several groups of Aboriginal people across a number of days. The group of Gaelic-speaking Scotsmen was known as the "Highland Brigade". The attack on the Brataualung people camped at Warrigal Creek was one of several incidents resulting in loss of life among the Gunai Kurnai people.

The estimates of numbers of deaths vary: some historical accounts say that 60 people were killed, while other sources suggest that up to 150 people may have been killed. Some historians assert that the number of 60 is an exaggeration, despite the witness accounts. The statistical discrepancies likely emerged because Macmillan's group killed Aboriginal people at five different locations in the area.

A witness, Willy Hoddinott, wrote the following in 1925: "The brigade coming up to the blacks camped around the Waterhole at Warrigal Creek surrounded them and fired into them, killing a great number, some escaped into the scrub, others jumped into the waterhole, and, as fast as they put their heads up for breath, they were shot until the water was red with blood. I knew two blacks, who though wounded came out of the hole alive. One was a boy at the time about 12 or 14 years old. He was hit in the eye by a slug, captured by the whites, and made to lead the 'brigade' from one camp to another."  Hoddinott said that more than 100 Aboriginal people were killed on that day.

Historian Peter Gardner, in a review of all accounts of the massacre, wrote that MacMillan and the Highland Brigade aimed to wipe out all the Aboriginal people in the area. Gardner concludes that McMillan's group initially killed two family groups at Warrigal Creek waterhole and then a few days later killed another 60 people at the mouth of Warrigal Creek, then killing three other groups at Freshwater Creek, Gammon Creek, and Red Hill.

Despite the widespread belief that MacMillan led several massacres,  there are over 12 monuments in the Gippsland region dedicated to him.

See also
 Gunai
 Gippsland massacres
List of massacres of Indigenous Australians

References

Bibliography
 The Book of the Bush
 "The Settling of Gippsland - A Regional History", by Patrick Morgan, published by Gippsland Municipalities Association, Traralgon, 1997 
 Gardner, Peter, 'The Warrigal Creek massacre', Journal of the Royal Australian Historical Society, pp. 47–51, June, 1980.

Further reading

 

 

1843 in Australia
July 1843 events
Massacres in 1843
History of Victoria (Australia)
Conflicts in 1843
Crime in Victoria (Australia)
Massacres of Indigenous Australians
Gunaikurnai